Eupithecia caliginea is a moth in the  family Geometridae. It is found in Japan.

References

Moths described in 1878
caliginea
Moths of Japan